Wells Fargo Tower may refer to:
Wells Fargo Tower (Birmingham), Alabama
Wells Fargo Tower (Colorado Springs), Colorado
Wells Fargo Tower (Fort Worth, Texas)
Wells Fargo Tower (Roanoke), Virginia

See also
Wells Fargo Building (disambiguation)
Wells Fargo Center (disambiguation)
Wells Fargo Plaza (disambiguation)